Jorge Ginarte (1940 – 7 June 2010) was an Argentine professional football player and coach.

Career

Playing career
Born in Buenos Aires, Ginarte played club football as a central defender for teams including Sarmiento and Los Andes. Ginarte won the Trofeo Costa del Sol in 1968 with Racing. He also played in Round One of the Copa Argentina in 1970 for Los Andes.

Coaching career
After retiring as a player, Ginarte coached a number of Argentine club sides. He won the Nacional B in 1974 with Temperley, and came second in 1999 with Los Andes.

Death
Ginarte died on 7 June 2010 at the age of 70.

References

1940 births
2010 deaths
Argentine footballers
Club Atlético Sarmiento footballers
Racing Club de Avellaneda footballers
Club Atlético Los Andes footballers
Argentine football managers
Atlético de Rafaela managers
Association football central defenders
Footballers from Buenos Aires
Club Atlético Tigre managers
Club Atlético Colón managers
C.D. Cuenca managers
Atlético Tucumán managers
Club San José managers